Neoclides (Ancient Greek: Νεοκλείδης, romanized: Neokleidēs, b. about 420 BCE) was an ancient Greek mathematician. He was a younger contemporary of Plato and Leodamas of Thasos and himself served at the Platonic Academy. He also taught Leon. Otherwise, not much is known about him.

References 

Ancient Greek mathematicians